The Pennsylvania Shakespeare Festival (PSF) is a professional theater company in residence at DeSales University in Center Valley, Pennsylvania and the official Shakespeare Festival of the Commonwealth of Pennsylvania.

The Festival is organized as a non-profit 501(c)(3) in Pennsylvania. Each summer, PSF produces six or more plays (often including a musical) and special one-night-only performances. In the fall, PSF tours a Shakespeare play to schools as part of its Linny Fowler WillPower tour.  Since its inception, the Festival has been attended by over 1,000,000 people. The acting company consists primarily of professional actors from New York and Philadelphia and who are members of Actors' Equity Association.  The plays are performed in two theaters in The Labuda Center for the Performing Arts: the 473-seat proscenium Mainstage or the 187-seat thrust Schubert Theater on the DeSales University campus in Center Valley.

Pennsylvania Shakespeare Festival is listed as a major festival in the book Shakespeare Festivals Around the World by Marcus D. Gregio (Editor), 2004.

Productions

2022 season 
Every Brilliant Thing - By Duncan Macmillan • June 7- June 19 • Schubert Theatre
A Chorus Line - Conceived and Originally Directed and Choreographed by Michael Bennett; Book by James Kirkwood & Nicholas Dante; Music by Marvin Hamlish; Lyrics by Edward Kleban; Co Choreographed by Bob Avian • June 22 - July 10 • Main Stage
Much Ado About Nothing - By William Shakespeare • July 13 - August 7 • Schubert Theatre
August Wilson's Fences - July 27-August 7 • Main Stage
The River Bride (Staged Reading) - By Marisela Treviño Orta • July 1 - July 3 • Schubert Theatre
Shakespeare For Kids - By Erin Sheffield • July 28 - August 6 • Main Stage
Little Red - By Andrew Kane • June 3 - August 6 • Schubert Theatre

2021 season 
Native Gardens- By Karen Zacharias
How I Learned What I Learned- By August Wilson • June 29 - July 11 • Main Stage
A Midsummer Night's Dream- By William Shakespeare • July 20 - August 1 • Air Products Open Air Theatre
In Concert with Phoenix Best- July 12 • Air Products Open Air Theatre
An Iliad- By Lisa Peterson and Denis O'Hare • July 7 - August 1 • Main Stage
Love's Labour's Lost- By William Shakespeare (PSF Young Company) • July 24–25 • Air Products Open Air Theatre
Charlotte's Web- By Joseph Robinette • June 25 - July 31 • Air Products Open Air Theatre

2020 season
Pennsylvania Shakespeare Festival's 2020 season was scheduled to begin on May 29, 2020. On March 30, 2020 Pennsylvania Shakespeare Festival released a statement saying that the 2020 season would be cancelled due to the COVID-19 pandemic. PSF continues to engage with patrons through the "At Home with PSF" program which features interviews with artists, staff memories, and theatre resources.

2019 season
Crazy for You - Music and Lyrics by George and Ira Gershwin; Book by Ken Ludwig • June 12 - June 30 • Main Stage
The Mystery of Irma Vep – A Penny Dreadful – By Charles Ludlam • June 20 - July 14 • Schubert Theatre
Antony & Cleopatra - By William Shakespeare • July 10 - August 4 • Main Stage
Private Lives - By Noël Coward • July 18 - August 4 • Main Stage
Henry IV, Part 1 - By William Shakespeare • July 24 - August 4 • Schubert Theatre
The Adventures of Robin Hood and Maid Marian - By Brandon E. McLauren • May 31 - August 3 • Schubert Theatre
 Shakespeare for Kids - By Erin Sheffield • July 24 - August 3 • Main Stage

2018 season
Ragtime - Book by Terrence McNally; Music by Stephen Flaherty; Lyrics by Lynn Ahrens; Based on the novel “RAGTIME” by E.L. Doctorow • June 13 - July 1 • Main Stage
Twelfth Night – By William Shakespeare • June 21 - July 15 • Schubert Theatre
Shakespeare in Love - Based on the screenplay by Marc Norman and Tom Stoppard; Adapted for the stage by Lee Hall; Music by Paddy Cunneen • July 11 - August 5 • Main Stage
King Richard II - By William Shakespeare • July 19 - August 5 • Main Stage
All's Well That Ends Well - By William Shakespeare • July 25 - August 5 • Schubert Theatre
Alice in Wonderland - By Michele L. Vacca • June 1 - August 4 • Schubert Theatre
 Shakespeare for Kids - By Erin Sheffield • July 25 - August 4 • Main Stage

2017 season
Evita - Lyrics by Tim Rice; Music by Andrew Llyod Webber • June 14 - July 2 • Main Stage
The Hound of the Baskervilles – By Sir Arthur Conan Doyle; Adapted by Steven Canny & John Nicholson • June 21 - July 16 • Schubert Theatre
The Three Musketeers - By Ken Ludwig; Adapted from the novel by Alexandre Dumas • July 12 - August 6 • Main Stage
As You Like It - By William Shakespeare • July 20 - August 6 • Main Stage
Troilus and Cressida - By William Shakespeare • July 26 - August 6 • Schubert Theatre
The Ice Princess - By Brandon E. McLauren; Adapted from Hans Christian Andersen • June 2 - August 5 • Schubert Theatre
 Shakespeare for Kids - By Erin Sheffield • July 26 - August 5 • Main Stage

2016 season
West Side Story - Based on a conception of Jerome Robbins; Book by Arthur Laurents; Music by Leonard Bernstein; Lyrics by Stephen Sondheim; Entire original production directed and choreography by Jerome Robbins; Inspired by Shakespeare's Romeo and Juliet • June 15 - July 3 • Main Stage
Julius Caesar – By William Shakespeare • June 22 - July 17 • Schubert Theatre
The Taming of the Shrew - By William Shakespeare • July 13 - August 7 • Main Stage
Blithe Spirit - By Noël Coward • July 21 - August 7 • Main Stage
Love's Labour's Lost - By William Shakespeare • July 27 - August 7 • Schubert Theatre
The Little Mermaid - By Linda Daugherty • June 3 - August 6 • Schubert Theatre
 Shakespeare for Kids - By Erin Sheffield • July 27 - August 6 • Main Stage

2015 season 
Les Misérables - Boubil and Schonberg's musical based on the 1862 novel by Victor Hugo Les Misérables • June 10 - June 28 • Main Stage 
Around the World in 80 Days – By Mark Brown • June 17 - July 12 • Schubert Theatre
The Foreigner (play) - By Larry Shue • July 8 - August 2 • Main Stage 
Henry V - William Shakespeare • July 16 - August 2 • Main Stage
Pericles - By William Shakespeare • July 22 - August 2 • Schubert Theatre 
Rapunzel - Brothers Grimm fairy tale adapted by Erin Sheffield • May 29 - August 1 • Schubert Theatre
Shakespeare for Kids - By Erin Sheffield • July 22 - August 1 • Schubert Theatre

WillPower Tour
The Festival's signature education program is the annual Linny Fowler WillPower Tour, which brings a professionally produced Shakespeare play to middle schools and high schools throughout Pennsylvania, New Jersey, and Delaware. Initiated in 2000, the WillPower Tour is a professionally directed 80-minute production with sets and costumes featuring a company of professionally-trained and experienced actors and teachers. Half-day or full-day programming meet academic standards with curriculum guides provided in advance. Post-performance discussion gives students the opportunity to share their reactions and insights. Celebrating its 20th year, the fall 2019 WillPower Tour's production of Macbeth reached over 11,000 students in Pennsylvania and New Jersey.

History
The Pennsylvania Shakespeare Festival was founded in 1992 by Gerard J. Schubert, O.S.F.S., founder and chair of Performing and Fine Arts department at DeSales University.

Notable Actors

Steve Burns - 2013, Clown 1, The 39 Steps; 2011, Dromio of Syracuse, The Comedy of Errors; 2007, Amadeus, Amadeus 
Keith Hamilton Cobb - 2016, Julius Caesar, Julius Caesar (play)
Christian Coulson - 2018, King Richard, King Richard II; 2018, Lord Wessex, Shakespeare in Love
Tom Degnan - 2012, Brick, Cat on a Hot Tin Roof, Don John, Much Ado about Nothing
Dan Domenech - 2017, Che, Evita
Mike Eldred - 2015, Jean Valjean, Les Misérables
Kate Fahrner - 2015, Fantine, Les Misérables
Alexie Gilmore - 2013, Gwendolyn, The Importance of Being Earnest
Jeremiah James - 2015, Javert, Les Misérables
William Michals - 2012, Sweeney Todd, Sweeney Todd: The Demon Barber of Fleet Street; 2011, Emile De Beque, South Pacific
Rachel Potter - 2015, Eponine, Les Misérables
Zack Robidas - 2015, Henry V, The Foreigner
Dee Roscioli - 2017, Eva Peron, Evita; 2012, Mrs. Lovett, Sweeney Todd: The Demon Barber of Fleet Street; 2010, Finale Cabaret
Marnie Schulenburg - 2011, Nellie Forbush, South Pacific; 2006, Celia, As You Like It, 2015 The Foreigner, Henry V
Paulo Szot - 2017, Juan Perón, Evita
Jo Twiss - 2012 - Big Mama, Cat on a Hot Tin Roof; 2011, Nurse, Romeo and Juliet
Delaney Westfall - 2015, Cosette, Les Misérables

References

Performing groups established in 1992
Festivals in Pennsylvania
Shakespeare festivals in the United States
Tourist attractions in Lehigh County, Pennsylvania
DeSales University